N. americanus may refer to:
 Nabis americanus, a minute pirate bug species
 Narceus americanus, a millipede species
 Necator americanus, a hookworm species
 Nicrophorus americanus, the American burying beetle or giant carrion beetle, a beetle species endemic to North America
 Numenius americanus, a bird species

See also
 Americanus (disambiguation)